The 1996 United States Senate election in South Dakota was held on November 4, 1996. Incumbent Republican U.S. Senator Larry Pressler ran for re-election to a fourth term, but was narrowly defeated by Democratic nominee Tim Johnson by 9,000 votes. Pressler was the only incumbent Senator to lose reelection in the 1996 cycle. This was the only seat that Democrats flipped during the regularly scheduled Senate elections.

Candidates

Democratic 
 Tim Johnson, U.S. Representative

Republican 
 Larry Pressler, incumbent U.S. Senator

Campaign
Pressler and Johnson swapped leads in their own polls all year. The two candidates also swapped charges. Pressler said that Johnson was too liberal for the state, while Johnson contended that Pressler was beholden to the out-of-state interests that have fattened his campaign coffers.

Seeking a fourth term, Pressler noted his seniority; his close ties to his longtime Senate colleague, Republican presidential candidate Bob Dole; and, most emphatically, the power he wielded as the chairman of the Commerce, Science and Transportation Committee.

However, the massive changes in telecommunications law that he shepherded through the Senate since becoming chairman the previous year proved to be a mixed blessing politically for Pressler.

Political action committees related to industries affected by the legislation were generous donors to his campaign, and Pressler assured South Dakota voters that, over the long run, the bill will lower prices and provide jobs. But both telephone and cable television rates went up in South Dakota that year, leading Pressler to pull an ad stating that phone rates were going down.

Despite this apparently negative short-term effect, Pressler said that Johnson's votes against the "telecom" bill, along with his opposition to the GOP's seven-year balanced-budget plan and changes in farm policy, proved Johnson votes inconsistent with his moderate rhetoric.

"You say one thing in South Dakota and vote liberal all the time in Washington," intoned an announcer in a Pressler TV ad. In another ad, which Pressler called "the essence of my campaign," the senator himself called Johnson a liberal.

Johnson countered that Pressler's vote for the deficit- reducing budget-reconciliation package was a blow against the interests of farmers and seniors, two groups that helped fuel Pressler's victories in the past. Johnson also warned that farmers will be more vulnerable in years of poor yield under the new farm law. The so-called Freedom To Farm Act received mixed reviews from major agriculture groups in the state. The results were 51% for Johnson and 49% for Pressler.

Results

See also
 1996 United States Senate elections

South Dakota
1996
1996 South Dakota elections